Paul Christopher Harris (born December 19, 1954) is a former American football linebacker who played two seasons in the National Football League with the Tampa Bay Buccaneers and Minnesota Vikings. He was drafted by the Pittsburgh Steelers in the sixth round of the 1977 NFL Draft. He played college football at the University of Alabama and attended Toulminville High School in Mobile, Alabama.

References

External links
Just Sports Stats

Living people
1954 births
Players of American football from Alabama
American football linebackers
African-American players of American football
Alabama Crimson Tide football players
Tampa Bay Buccaneers players
Minnesota Vikings players
Sportspeople from Mobile, Alabama
21st-century African-American people
20th-century African-American sportspeople